Ōtaki is a town in the Kapiti Coast District of the North Island of New Zealand, situated half way between the capital city Wellington,  to the southwest, and Palmerston North,  to the northeast.

Ōtaki is located on New Zealand State Highway 1 and the North Island Main Trunk railway between Wellington and Auckland and marks the northernmost point of the Wellington Region.

History

Since the early 19th century, the area has been home to Māori of the Ngāti Raukawa iwi who had migrated from the Kawhia area from about 1819, under the leadership of Te Rauparaha. They had supplanted the Rangitāne and Muaūpoko people.

At the request of Te Rauparaha, missionaries Henry Williams and Octavius Hadfield visited the area in December and Hadfield opened the first mission in the Wellington Region at Otaki. At the nearby Raukawa marae is the Rangiātea Church, the original of which was completed in 1851. Burnt down in 1995, it was completely rebuilt by 2003. The Reverend James McWilliam was Clergyman in charge of the Maori Mission in Otaki under the Church Missionary Society of England from 1868 to 1906 with the support of his wife, Emily McWilliam.

Marae

The community has two marae, affiliated with the iwi of Ngāti Raukawa ki te Tonga and its hapū.

Te Pou o Tainui Marae and Kapumanawawhiti meeting house are affiliated with the hapū of Ngāti Kapumanawawhiti. In October 2020, the Government committed $159,203 from the Provincial Growth Fund to upgrade the marae, and create 12 jobs.

Raukawa Marae and meeting house are affiliated with the hapū of Ngāti Korokī, Ngāti Maiotaki and Ngāti Pare. In October 2020, the Government committed $337,112 from the Provincial Growth Fund to upgrade the marae, and create 12 jobs.

Pukekaraka Marae in Ōtaki was the site of a Catholic mission from 1842. It includes the Roma meeting house, built in 1904, and Hine Nui O Te Ao Katoa meeting house, built for tangi and larger gatherings in 1905. The marae has been used by both Ngāti Raukawa ki te Tonga and Muaupoko. In October 2020, the Government committed $143,984 from the Provincial Growth Fund to upgrade the site, creating an estimated 8 jobs.

Demographics

Ōtaki had a population of 3,489 at the 2018 New Zealand census, an increase of 390 people (12.6%) since the 2013 census, and an increase of 636 people (22.3%) since the 2006 census. There were 1,416 households. There were 1,641 males and 1,848 females, giving a sex ratio of 0.89 males per female. The median age was 43.1 years (compared with 37.4 years nationally), with 759 people (21.8%) aged under 15 years, 552 (15.8%) aged 15 to 29, 1,335 (38.3%) aged 30 to 64, and 843 (24.2%) aged 65 or older.

Ethnicities were 67.3% European/Pākehā, 41.4% Māori, 6.4% Pacific peoples, 5.9% Asian, and 1.8% other ethnicities (totals add to more than 100% since people could identify with multiple ethnicities).

The proportion of people born overseas was 12.8%, compared with 27.1% nationally.

Although some people objected to giving their religion, 50.4% had no religion, 35.5% were Christian, 0.3% were Hindu, 0.1% were Muslim, 0.8% were Buddhist and 4.6% had other religions.

Of those at least 15 years old, 435 (15.9%) people had a bachelor or higher degree, and 570 (20.9%) people had no formal qualifications. The median income was $23,200, compared with $31,800 nationally. The employment status of those at least 15 was that 1,029 (37.7%) people were employed full-time, 387 (14.2%) were part-time, and 126 (4.6%) were unemployed.

Geography

The town is situated at the northern end of the Kāpiti Coast, close to the banks of the Ōtaki River, 4 kilometres from its outflow into the Tasman Sea.

The surrounding district includes Te Horo and Manakau and the beach settlement at Waikawa Beach. The district is agricultural, with market gardens and lifestyle blocks. The economy of the town includes service industries for the rural community.  Ōtaki has two local newspapers – Ōtaki Today and the Ōtaki Mail.

Features

Ōtaki is home to Te Wānanga o Raukawa a Tikanga Māori university. It also hosts the annual Māoriland Film Festival and Otaki Kite Festival. and is home of The Ōtaki-Māori Racing Club. established in 1886.

Ōtaki Forks is the western gateway to the Tararua Forest Park. It offers recreational activities ranging from short walks, swimming, rafting and kayaking to advanced tramps of 3 – 5 days duration, including the Southern Crossing that ends at Kaitoke 45 km northeast of Wellington.

Ōtaki Beach spans the stretch of coastline between the Ōtaki River and the Waitohu Stream,  with a  residential community of both permanent and holiday homes.   The beach is popular for surfing, swimming, recreational fishing, horse riding, walking and photography.

Sports 
Otaki Golf Club established in 1901, is a links style 18 hole golf course located at the northern end of the historic Old Coach Road.

Otaki Surf Life Saving Club actively patrols the beach during the summer.

Other sports facilities include rugby, rugby league, netball, swimming, wakaama, water polo, football, squash, and tennis.

Community 
The Māoriland Film Festival which began in 2014 is held annually in Otaki with a focus on indigenous film content.

The Otaki Museum is located at 49 Main Street in the former BNZ building and provides access to local history collections, oral histories, photographs and documents.

Infrastructure and services 
Both State Highway 1 and the North Island Main Trunk railway passes through the town, connecting it with Paraparaumu and Wellington to the south and Levin, Palmerston North and ultimately Auckland in the north. The Peka Peka to Ōtaki section of the Kapiti Expressway opened in December 2022, allowing State Highway 1 through traffic to bypass the town.

Electra operates the electricity distribution network in Ōtaki. The town is normally supplied from Transpower's national grid at its Paraparaumu substation, but can be switched to be supplied from the Mangahao substation near Shannon.

The town's fresh water supply is drawn from three groundwater bores.

Education

Early Learning Schools

Ōtaki Montessori School is a co-educational pre-school for children from ages 2–6.

Ōtaki Early Learning Centre is a co-educational pre-school for children of age 2 and above.

Primary schools

Kura Kaupapa

Secondary school

Notable people
 Vincent Bevan, New Zealand and Wellington rugby-union player.
 Iain Hewitson, Australian TV chef.
 Carla Van Zon, artistic director.
 Sir William Walkley, oil-company executive.
 Inia Te Wiata
 Shay Evans, (aka Felicity Frockaccino) Drag Entertainer & TV personality.

References

Populated places in the Wellington Region
Kapiti Coast District